The Chief of Defence Staff of the Indian Armed Forces (CDS) is the professional head and permanent Chairman of the Chiefs of Staff Committee (COSC) of the Indian Armed Forces. The Chief of Defence Staff is the highest-ranking uniformed officer on active duty in the Indian military and chief military adviser to the Minister of Defence. The Chief also heads the Department of Military Affairs. The CDS is assisted by a vice-chief, the Chief of Integrated Defence Staff.

The first Chief of Defence Staff, General Bipin Rawat, took office on 1 January 2020. The position was created with the aim of improving coordination, tri-service effectiveness and overall integration of the combat capabilities of the Indian armed forces. At the time of the creation of the post, no analogous position existed.

Setting the stage for appointment of the Chief of Defence Staff (CDS), the government amended Service Rules of the Army, Navy and Air Force, allowing retired Service Chiefs and three-star officers eligible for consideration for the country’s top military post. 

However, with an age limit that the retired officer should not have attained 62 years on the date of appointment, retired Service chiefs are largely ruled out, especially so for the present consideration. 

“The Central Government may, if considered necessary, in public interest, appoint as CDS, an officer who is serving as Lieutenant General or General or an officer who has retired in the rank of Lieutenant General or General but has not attained the age of 62 on the date of appointment,” the amendment in the Service Rules of the Army says in the gazette dated 6 June 2022. Similar amendment was made in the service rules of Navy and Air Force as well.

On 28 Sep 2022, the Government decided to appoint Lt General Anil Chauhan (Retired) PVSM, UYSM, AVSM, SM, VSM as the next Chief of Defence Staff (CDS) who shall also function as Secretary to the Government of India, Department of Military Affairs with effect from the date of his assumption of charge and until further orders.

History

The post of the Chairman of the Chief of Staff Committee (Chairman-CoSC) was created in 1947 as a precursor to the post of CDS, responsible for advice to the Defence Minister on all military matters. The senior-most of the three service chiefs would be appointed Chairman CoSC.

The need for a Chief of Defence Staff was felt as early as 1960s following wars with Pakistan and China. Over the years the creation of such as post was raised. However, officially, it was only following the Kargil Review Committee's recommendation in 1999 that the Group of Ministers (GoM) officially proposed the creation of the post of CDS in 2001. Following committees, including the Naresh Chandra task force in 2012 and the Lieutenant General D. B. Shekatkar Committee in 2016, also proposed their own versions of a CDS. The process of consulting all parties involved began in 2006. In 2017, the Cabinet Committee on Security started the process of making the final decision related to the creation of a post for the CDS.

The matter had opposition over the years on various fronts. After the war of 1971, Chief of the Air Staff, Air Chief Marshal Pratap Chandra Lal, had threatened to quit if the post of CDS was created. In 2001 the government was on the brink of making the then Chief of the Naval Staff Admiral, Sushil Kumar, the CDS. A date had been fixed including other formalities. However, due to turf wars, among other reasons, the idea was scrapped.

The official decision to create the position was made by Prime Minister Narendra Modi during his Independence Day speech on 15 August 2019 at the Red Fort, in New Delhi. Following the announcement, a committee was announced on 23 August 2019 under the National Security Advisor, consisting of the Cabinet Secretary, the Defence Secretary and the Chairman of the Chief of Staff Committee (C-COSC) among others, to make final the powers of the CDS. The committee was to submit its report within six weeks. By November 2019, the committee had largely completed its tasks. On 24 December, the Cabinet Committee on Security (CCS) formally established the post of Chief of Defence Staff.

The first Chief of Defence Staff was General Bipin Rawat who took office on 1 January 2020. On 15 December 2021, following the death of General Rawat, General Manoj Mukund Naravane was appointed Chairman of the Chiefs of Staff Committee, pending the appointment of a new CDS. This decision was made, as there was no clear order of succession for the CDS.

Functions
At the time of creation of the post in December 2019, and as the permanent Chairman of the Chiefs of Staff Committee, the CDS would implement integration and jointness of the three services, assign inter-services prioritisation to capital acquisition proposals, command the tri-service agencies, head the Department of Military Affairs and be a member of overall defence planning among other responsibilities.

Among the first reforms proposed by the firsts CDS was the creation of an Air Defence Command. Following the COVID-19 pandemic, the CDS emphasised the need to minimise costly defence imports, give a chance to domestic production even with only 70% of the general staff qualitative requirements, and not 'misrepresent operational requirements'. In February 2020, the CDS announced the creation of joint military commands and theatre commands, Integrated Theatre Commands; and that the process of theaterisation will be complete in a number of years. Each command will have units from Army, Navy and Air-force working in synergy with each other. In September 2021, the CDS aired views on a prospective rocket or missile force.

Uniform and insignia
While the Chief of Defence Staff wears the appropriately coloured uniform of their parent service, the gold-wreathed tri-service emblem of the Indian Armed Forces (the Naval anchor, crossed Army swords and Air Force eagle, all surmounted by the national emblem of India) is used in place of service insignia and unit emblems. The wreathed tri-service emblem is also substituted for service cap badges, uniform button and belt badge service insignia, shoulder flashes and the shoulder rank badges of a four-star officer with the four-star gorget patches similar to that used by a service chief. While the car pennant is that of the officer's parent service, the tri-service emblem is substituted for the rank stars.

Appointees
Key
 - Died in office

§ - Appointee retired from a 3-star rank

! colspan=9| Vacant

See also 
 Chairman of the Chiefs of Staff Committee
 Chief of the General Staff
 Commander-in-Chief of India
 Defence Secretary (India)

References

Further reading 

Books
 

Think-tanks and journals
 
 
 
 

Articles

External links 

Ministry of Defence (India)
Indian Army
Indian Air Force
Indian Navy
Indian military appointments
India